Kheyrabad (also Romanized as Kheyrābād) is a village in Fazl Rural District, in the Central District of Nishapur County, Razavi Khorasan Province, Iran. At the 2006 census, its population was 34, in 9 families.

References 

Populated places in Nishapur County